Peter Brickey House may refer to:

Peter Brickey House (Steelville, Missouri), listed on the National Register of Historic Places in Crawford County, Missouri
Peter Brickey House (Townsend, Tennessee), listed on the National Register of Historic Places in Blount County, Tennessee